Grant, Ritchie and Company was a Scottish engineering firm based in Kilmarnock, Scotland. The company's products included steam engines and steam locomotives.

History
In 1876, there was a disastrous fire at Andrew Barclay’s Caledonia works in Kilmarnock. At this point, two employees of Andrew Barclay, Thomas Grant and William Ritchie, set up Grant, Ritchie and Company at Townholme Engine Works, Kilmarnock to manufacture steam locomotives. They took over an existing business called Grant Brothers but it is not known whether there was a family connection to Thomas Grant.

Grant, Ritchie also built colliery winding engines and one of these is preserved at the National Mining Museum; a 2400 hp engine built for the Victoria Colliery in the 1890s. A Grant, Ritchie locomotive is preserved at the Ribble Steam Railway, currently on loan at York until April 2017.

References

External links

Locomotive manufacturers of the United Kingdom
Engineering companies of Scotland
Kilmarnock
1876 establishments in Scotland
Manufacturing companies established in 1876
British companies established in 1876